The Wm. Wrigley Jr. Company, known as the Wrigley Company, is an American multinational chewing gum (Wrigley's gum) company, based in the Global Innovation Center (GIC) in Goose Island, Chicago, Illinois. 

Wrigley's is wholly owned by Mars, Incorporated, and, along with Mars chocolate bars and other candy products, makes up Mars Wrigley Confectionery. It is the largest manufacturer and marketer of chewing gum in the world.

The company currently sells its products in over 180 countries and districts, operates in over 50 countries, and has 21 production facilities in 14 countries including the United States, Mexico, Spain, the United Kingdom, France, the Czech Republic, Colombia, Poland, Russia, China, India, Japan, Kenya, Australia, and New Zealand.

History 
The company was founded on April 1, 1891, in Chicago, Illinois by William Wrigley Jr. Wrigley's gum was traditionally made out of chicle, sourced largely from Latin America. In 1952, in response to Decree 900, land reforms attempting to end feudal working conditions for peasant farmers in Guatemala, Wrigley's discontinued purchasing chicle from that country. In the 1960s, Wrigley's changed the composition of its chewing gum from using chicle to synthetic rubber, which was cheaper to manufacture.

Wrigley's announced the closure of its Santa Cruz, California manufacturing plant in April 1996. The plant had been built in 1955. The 385,000-square-foot manufacturing facility was put on the market in October 1996 for US$11.3 million, or about $30 a square foot.

In 2005, Wrigley purchased Life Savers and Altoids from Kraft Foods for US$1.5 billion. On January 23, 2007, Wrigley signed a purchase agreement to acquire an 80% initial interest in A. Korkunov for $300 million with the remaining 20% to be acquired over time. On April 28, 2008, Mars, Incorporated announced that it would acquire Wrigley for approximately $23 billion. Financing for the transaction was provided by Berkshire Hathaway, Goldman Sachs, and JPMorgan; Berkshire Hathaway held a minority equity investment in Wrigley until October 2016.

The Wrigley Building on Michigan Avenue, one of Chicago's best-known landmarks on the Magnificent Mile, was originally the company's global headquarters until 2011, when it was sold to an investor group that included Zeller Realty Group as well as Groupon co-founders Eric Lefkofsky and Brad Keywell. The company has been headquartered in the GIC since 2012.

In 2016, Mars announced that Wrigley would be merged with its chocolate segment to form a new subsidiary, Mars Wrigley Confectionery. The new company will maintain global offices in Chicago, while moving its U.S. offices to New Jersey, in Hackettstown and Newark, respectively.

Corporate leadership

1891–1932: William Wrigley Jr.

In 1891, 29-year-old William Wrigley Jr. (1861–1932) came to Chicago from Philadelphia with $32 and the idea to start a business selling Wrigley's Scouring Soap. Wrigley offered premiums as an incentive to buy his soap, such as baking powder. Later in his career, he switched to the baking powder business, in which he began offering two packages of chewing gum for each purchase of a can of baking powder. The popular premium, chewing gum, began to seem more promising, prompting another switch in product focus. Wrigley also became the majority owner of the Chicago Cubs in 1921.

1932–1961: Philip K. Wrigley
After William Wrigley Jr. died, his son Philip K. Wrigley (1894–1977) assumed his father's position as CEO of the Wrigley Company. Wrigley is most well known for his unusual move to support US troops and protect the reputation of the Wrigley brand during World War II, in which he dedicated the entire output of Wrigley's Spearmint, Doublemint, and Juicy Fruit to the US Armed Forces. Wrigley launched the "Remember this Wrapper" ad campaign to keep the Wrigley brands on the minds of the customers during times of wartime rationing. Wrigley's P.K. brand was named after P.K. Wrigley.

1961–1999: William Wrigley III
In 1961, Philip K. Wrigley handed control to his son, William Wrigley III (1933–1999). Wrigley led a strategic global expansion by establishing Wrigley facilities in nine new countries. On June 26, 1974, a Marsh Supermarket in Troy, Ohio installed the first bar code scanning equipment. The first product to be scanned using a Universal Product Code (UPC) bar code was a 10-pack of Wrigley's Juicy Fruit gum. (This pack of gum is now on display at the Smithsonian Institution's National Museum of American History.) In 1984, Wrigley introduced a new gum, Extra, which followed the new trend of sugar-free gums in the US. Wrigley also assumed control of the Chicago Cubs after his father's death in 1977, and sold the team to the Chicago Tribune in 1981.

1999–2006: William Wrigley IV
William "Beau" Wrigley IV (1963–), following the death of Wrigley III (his father), led the sugar-free gum campaign across Europe, Australia, Spain, India, and China. In 2005, Kraft Foods sold the Life Savers and Altoids businesses to Wrigley in exchange for $1.5 billion as part of a reorganization plan. Wrigley helped establish the Wrigley Science Institute (WSI) in 2006 to study the oral health benefits of gum chewing. The WSI investigates the effects of gum chewing on weight management, stress relief, concentration, and oral health.

2006–2008: William Perez
On October 23, 2006, William D. Perez (1948–) succeeded Bill Wrigley as CEO, becoming the first person outside the Wrigley family to head the company. In 2007, the company debuted 5 Gum in the US. The 5 Gum brand was marketed using cinematic TV commercials portraying "How it feels to chew 5 Gum." Perez led the efforts of improving slimmer packaging (Slim Pack) with flavor improvements across both Extra and Wrigley brands.

2008–2011: Dushan "Duke" Petrovich
Dushan Petrovich (1954–) succeeded Perez almost immediately after Mars, Incorporated's 2008 purchase of Wrigley. In 2009, Wrigley's Global Innovation Center received the LEED Gold Certification through Wrigley's commitment to global sustainability. In the 2010 Olympic Games in Vancouver, British Columbia, Wrigley was the Official Confectionery Supplier of the games, in which the company sported Olympic-themed packs and products.

2011–2017: Martin Radvan
Martin Radvan became the president of the Wrigley Company after Petrovich. He is responsible for the company's worldwide strategy, operations, and business performance.

2017 to present: Andrew Clarke

Subsidiaries
 The Wrigley Company Limited
 Amurol Confections Company
 Northwestern Flavors, LLC

Changes in gum
In some countries, xylitol is used to sweeten gum instead of aspartame. By avoiding sugar, the chance of tooth decay is lowered, since the sugar otherwise used may turn into acid after chewing the gum. It is also claimed that in chewing, it may help to remove food residues. Xylitol-based products are allowed by the US Food and Drug Administration to make the medical claim that they do not promote dental cavities. Xylitol is fatal to dogs in small amounts.

New product
In 2013, Wrigley temporarily halted production and sales of its new Alert energy gum after the US Food and Drug Administration said it would investigate the safety of added caffeine in food products.

Brands

Gum

United States
 Juicy Fruit (1893)
 Spearmint (1893)
 Doublemint (1914)
 Freedent (1975)
 Big Red (1975)
 Hubba Bubba (1979)
 Extra (1984)
 Winterfresh (1994)
 Orbit (reintroduced 2001)
 Eclipse (2001)
 5 (2007)

Canada
 5
 Doublemint
 Excel
 Excel Mist
 Excel White
 Extra
 Extra Professional
 Extra Professional White
 Hubba Bubba
 Juicy Fruit
 Freedent

The Wrigley Company Ltd., Estover, Plymouth, UK
 Airwaves
 Hubba Bubba
 Doublemint
 Extra
 Altoids
 Juicy Fruit
 Tunes
 Rondo – a mint flavored candy brand owned by Wrigley Company. It was, prior to 2008, a brand of parent company Mars Incorporated.
 Wrigley's Spearmint
 Lockets

Additional products and brands
 Altoids
 Big Boy
 Big G
 Big League Chew (until November 2010)
 Boomer
 Bubble Tape
 Cool Air
 Eclipse
 Excel
 Hubba Bubba
 Life Savers
 Gummi Savers

 Life Saver Minis
 Life Saver Fusions
 Creme Savers
 PimPom
 P.K.
 Skittles
 Solano
 Starburst
 Sugus
 Lockets
 TaTa
 Tunes

See also

 Wrigley Building
 Wrigley Field—Chicago
 Wrigley Field—Los Angeles
 Wrigley Institute for Environmental Studies—Catalina Island
 Wrigley Rooftops
 Wrigley Square
 Wrigleyville

References

Alpine Gum
Alpine Gum was a gum made by Wrigley's, and was only sold in Canada. It is an alternative to cough syrup. It cools the throat and relieves sore throat pain. Alpine was discontinued in 2005.

External links

 
 
 
 Company profile at Yahoo!
 

 
Mars, Incorporated
Food and drink companies established in 1891
Confectionery companies of the United States
Chewing gum
Irish-American history
2008 mergers and acquisitions
1891 establishments in Illinois